Park Creek can refer to:

Park Creek (Plateau Creek) in Colorado
Park Creek (Little Neshaminy Creek) in Pennsylvania
Park Creek (Bear Butte Creek) in South Dakota
Park Creek (Baker River) in Washington